Motherhood is the state of being a mother.

Motherhood may also refer to:
 Motherhood (1917 film), an American lost silent drama film
 Motherhood (1945 film), a Swedish drama film
 Motherhood (2009 film), an American independent comedy-drama film
 "Motherhood" (Xena episode), an episode of the television series Xena: Warrior Princess
 Motherhood, an apparel brand name of Motherhood Maternity Inc. 
 "Motherhood" (ER), an episode of the television series ER

See also
 Maternity (disambiguation)
 Fatherhood (disambiguation)
 Parenthood (disambiguation)